Chirine Njeim (born 4 October 1984) is a Lebanese alpine skier and long-distance runner.

She represented Lebanon in the 2002, 2006 and the 2010 Winter Olympics, and the 2016 Summer Olympics.

Biography
Njeim started skiing at age 3. At 12, she went to France to train for 2 of years with a personal coach.

She then moved to Salt Lake City in the United States in ninth grade, when she was 13, to attend the Rowmark Ski Academy, former home of U.S. Olympian Picabo Street. She went on to study at, and compete for, the University of Utah.

Njeim married Ronny Kamal, a Lebanese-American management consultant, in 2012 - the couple first met when they were seated together on a flight from Beirut to the United States in 2009. Since marrying the couple have lived in Chicago.

Whilst in Chicago Njeim took up running, completing the 2012 Chicago Marathon in 3 hours 7 minutes and the 2013 edition of the race in 3:05.4. At the 2015 Chicago Marathon she posted a time of 2:46.41, placing her 29th among the women in the field. At the 2016 Houston Marathon, she completed the course in 2:44.14, securing herself a place on the Lebanese team at the 2016 Summer Olympics. She finished the 2016 Olympic Marathon in 109th place with a time of 2:51.08.

2002 Winter Olympics

2006 Winter Olympics

2010 Winter Olympics

2016 Summer Olympics

References

External links
Torino 2006 Official Site
Vancouver 2010 Official Site

1984 births
Living people
Alpine skiers at the 2002 Winter Olympics
Alpine skiers at the 2006 Winter Olympics
Alpine skiers at the 2010 Winter Olympics
Lebanese female alpine skiers
Lebanese female marathon runners
Olympic alpine skiers of Lebanon
Athletes (track and field) at the 2016 Summer Olympics
Olympic athletes of Lebanon
Female marathon runners
Lebanese female athletes
Athletes (track and field) at the 2018 Mediterranean Games
Mediterranean Games competitors for Lebanon